Fort Shaw (originally named Camp Reynolds) was a United States Army fort located on the Sun River 24 miles west of Great Falls, Montana, in the United States. It was founded on June 30, 1867, and abandoned by the Army in July 1891. It later served as a school for Native American children from 1892 to 1910. Portions of the fort survive today as a small museum. The fort lent its name to the community of Fort Shaw, Montana, which grew up around it.

Fort Shaw is part of the Fort Shaw Historic District and Cemetery, which was added to the National Register of Historic Places on January 11, 1985.

Founding the fort
Most of what was to become Montana became part of the United States with the Louisiana Purchase of 1803. Although first organized into an incorporated territory in 1805 as part of the Louisiana Territory, it was not until large numbers of farmers, miners, and fur trappers began moving into the region in the 1850s that the government of the United States paid much attention to the area. The creation of the Montana Territory in 1864 came about, in part, due to the rapid influx of miners after the gold strikes of 1862 to 1864 in the southwest part of the state.

Camp Reynolds was established on the site on June 30, 1867. The camp was established by Major William Clinton, in command of four companies of the 13th Infantry Regiment. The first Blackfeet Indian Agency office, established in 1854 by Isaac Stevens (Governor of the Washington Territory), was also nearby. The 13th Infantry Regiment previously established Camp Cooke near the mouth of the Judith River in July 1866, and Camp Reynolds was intended to keep the Mullan Road open and prohibit further Native American attacks on settlements to the south.

On July 4, 1867, the United States Department of the Army issued orders to have the name of the encampment changed to Fort Shaw in honor of Colonel Robert Gould Shaw, a Union Army officer who commanded the all-black 54th Regiment Massachusetts Volunteer Infantry during the American Civil War. The post's name was changed on August 1, 1867. Initially, Fort Shaw was to have had barracks space for six companies of infantry, but this was scaled back to four companies after the U.S. Army decided to build Fort Ellis near present-day Bozeman, Montana. Fort Shaw, along with Fort Ellis, was one of two principal U.S. Army forts intended to protect the burgeoning mining settlements of south-central and southwest Montana.

Construction of the fort
When first established, Fort Shaw consisted of officers and men housed in canvas tents. Construction of log cabin housing began in August 1867, and by late fall the men had constructed barracks for half the soldiers, a temporary storehouse, and three officers' huts. But only half of the post hospital was erected before cold weather forced construction to halt and the men to enter winter quarters. The finished buildings were only barely habitable and the men and officers very cramped, but the winter was not a harsh one. The remaining structures were raised and finished in the spring and summer of 1868. During 1869, the structures were made more comfortable and military decorations added. Floors were hard-packed dirt (and remained so throughout the fort's existence).

Fort Shaw was constructed around a square parade ground  on each side. The interior and exterior building walls were made of adobe bricks  in size. The interior walls of the seven officers' quarters were finished in white plaster, and had glass windows set in white-painted wood casements. There were four U-shaped infantry barracks, each  on a side and with  ceilings. Barracks walls were unfinished, and had four windows ( in size). Each barracks contained several rooms: A sergeant's room, a storeroom, a mess room, kitchen, laundry, and sleeping quarters/recreation room. Roofs were boards at first, but shingled as shingles became available.

A number of other buildings were also constructed. These included a commissary and quartermaster storehouse, which in its interior included a commissary officer's office; a company clerk's office; a room for issuing stores; two storerooms; and a quartermaster's office. The U-shaped storehouse also had a cellar and a  yard, enclosed by a gate. A chapel, post school, library, bakery, ordnance (weapons and ammunition) room, magazine, water tanks, outhouses, and outdoor brick washing sinks made up the rest of the post.

Fort Shaw was so well laid out and so beautifully constructed that it was called the "queen of Montana's military posts".

Life at the fort
The river was shallow and easily forded almost anywhere along its length, except during the spring freshets.

Food was largely imported. A limited supply of fish was obtained from the Sun River, which at that time was a clear, swift-running stream with a stony bottom. Wild game (bighorn sheep, black-tailed deer, elk, pronghorn, and white-tailed deer), ducks, geese, prairie chicken, rabbits, and sage-grouse were often hunted for food, but were scarce in the area and not relied on heavily for food. Nearby ranches supplied the post with vegetables, albeit at very high prices. Flour was usually shipped in from the east, as the Montana-grown summer wheat produced bread which was dark and heavy.

Fuel was scarce.

Water, too, was a problem. The valley was very well-drained by the river, and no springs were located near the post. Water was obtained by digging a long trench from the river to the post. Although a steam engine was later used to pump water from the river to various building via wooden pipes, these pipes often became clogged or froze in winter. Below-ground wooden pipes were laid in 1885 to rectify the problem.

Forage for animals was also an issue. Since the strong drainage inhibited the growth of grass, hay had to be imported from elsewhere in Montana, primarily the Missouri River valley to the east.

Disease was common. Influenza, fever, and diarrhea (particularly in the spring) were common. Although smallpox regularly killed hundreds of Native Americans in the area each year, few members of the Army came down with the disease.

Fort Shaw was not an isolated post. Mail was delivered three times a week, the fort served as a post office for the local populace, and there was a telegraph office for both civilian and military use.

History of the fort

Early leadership

Major William Clinton's command of Fort Shaw was only temporary. On August 11, 1867, Colonel I. V. D. Reeves transferred the 13th Infantry Regiment's headquarters to Fort Shaw. Lieutenant Colonel G. L. Andrews was regimental second-in-command, and named headquarters commandant, overseeing the operations of the fort itself. During their tenure at the fort, a steam engine was brought in to pump water from the river to the kitchens and sinks. The unit also received breech-loading rifles, which greatly increased its effectiveness. About 33 civilians were employed at the fort as well, working as blacksmiths, carpenters, clerks, masons, and saddlers. One of Colonel Reeves' first actions was to disarm the Montana Militia, a short-lived paramilitary organization formed by Acting Governor Thomas Francis Meagher in 1864 and supplied with arms by the U.S. Army. Reeves acted quickly, and the militia was disbanded by October 1, 1867.

General Phillipe Régis de Trobriand took command of Fort Shaw on June 4, 1869. A steam engine (whether a second one or a replacement is unclear) was brought to the fort in 1869. Excessive drinking and desertion by his troops were a constant problem. General Trobriand and the 13th Infantry Regiment left Fort Shaw on June 11, 1870. His unit was replaced by the headquarters company and six companies of the 7th Infantry Regiment, commanded by Colonel John Gibbon.

Command of Colonel Gibbon and fighting in the Indian Wars
Gibbon worked to improve living conditions at Fort Shaw. He improved the roofing of the barracks buildings, had the exterior walls of all buildings plastered, expanded the storehouses, and expanded and improved the corrals and stables. Irrigation for the fort's vegetable garden was completed, and companies assigned to maintain each plot. In 1871, he obtained a plow for tilling the garden. He also worked to expand the fort's civilian workforce, adding carpenters, masons, and sawmill operators. Desertion and theft of fort supplies, both major problems, were also reduced.

Gibbon also worked to improve security in the area. He began surveying and constructing a road between Fort Shaw and Camp Baker (near present-day White Sulphur Springs) to provide better communications with that post and to better monitor the movements of Native American groups and bands. This so improved security in the area that Gibbon counseled against the construction of a blockhouse at Camp Baker because it would send a signal to whites that the area was still not free from Native American attack. Gibbon also used his troops to scout out the little-explored area of the Rocky Mountain Front. These explorations led to the rediscovery and accurate mapping of Lewis and Clark Pass.

The area around Fort Shaw was a hotbed of conflict between Native Americans and white settlers in the late 1860s. A series of Piegan Blackfeet and Sioux raids between 1865 and 1869 left several whites dead. One of them was the brother of the Piegan leader Mountain Chief, who initiated a series of reprisals which killed about 25 white settlers. In response, General Philip Sheridan ordered Major Eugene Baker to take two companies of the 2d Cavalry Regiment from Fort Ellis and two companies of infantry from Fort Shaw and attack Mountain Chief's band of Piegans. Baker attacked the Piegans on the morning of January 23, 1870. Unfortunately, he attacked the wrong band: The Piegans were led by Heavy Runner, a Piegan Blackfeet who had signed a peace agreement with the United States. When Heavy Runner rushed out of his camp with his peace treaty in hand, he was shot dead. In what became known as the Marias Massacre, more than 173 Piegean Blackfeet (including 53 women and children) were murdered.

Just five years later, in 1874, gold was discovered by the U.S. Army in the Black Hills of the Dakotas. A gold rush occurred in 1875 and 1876 in which thousands of white miners and settlers flooded the area in violation of several treaties guaranteeing that the Black Hills would belong to the Lakota people. Conflict between Native Americans and white settlers broke out. Responding to pleas from whites, President Ulysses S. Grant decided to clear the Black Hills of all native people. After an attack against a combined Sioux-Cheyenne village on the Powder River by General George Crook accomplished little in March 1876, General Sheridan decided on a three-pronged attack to occur in southwestern Montana in the summer of 1876. Colonel Gibbon was ordered to form a "Montana Column" from elements of at Fort Shaw and Fort Ellis, and to march south across the plains to ensure that no Native American tribes moved north or west of the Yellowstone River. After reaching the Yellowstone, he was to move downstream until he rendezvoused with a "Dakota Column", under the command of General Alfred Terry. Gibbon left Fort Shaw on March 17, 1877, with five companies (about 200 men and 12 officers), and reached Fort Ellis on March 22. In April, Gibbon left Fort Ellis with both infantry and cavalry (totalling about 450 men and officers), heading for the Yellowstone. On June 20, Gibbon's command rendezvoused with Terry at the mouth of the Rosebud River. General Terry ordered his subordinate, Lieutenant Colonel George Armstrong Custer, to proceed south along the Rosebud and then west to the Little Bighorn River. Custer was to follow the Little Bighorn River north to the Bighorn River, where he was to rendezvous with Gibbon and Terry—who were to proceed west along the Yellowstone to the Bighorn, and then south along the Bighorn to meet Custer. Subsequently, Gibbon's Fort Shaw soldiers did not participate in the Battle of the Little Bighorn on June 25–26, during which most of Custer's command was famously wiped out. Gibbon entered the valley of the Little Bighorn on June 27, where the Fort Shaw soldiers assisted in burying the dead.

Soldiers at Fort Shaw participated in another famous Indian battle in 1877. For many years, several bands of the Nez Perce people lived in the valley of the Wallowa River in northeast Oregon. But increasing white settlement in the area led to calls to have the Native Americans placed on a reservation. In May 1877, General Oliver O. Howard ordered all remaining Nez Perce onto a reservation with 30 days. Several young Native Americans killed some white settlers, leading to a reprisal by General Howard. Yet, in the Battle of White Bird Canyon on June 17, 1877, a force of about 80 Nez Perce warriors defeated a unit of 200 of Howard's artillery, cavalry, and infantry. More than 800 Nez Perce men, women, and children tried to flee over Lolo Pass into Montana to seek help from other tribes, which deeply alarmed whites in the Montana Territory. A hundred Nez Perce held off 500 U.S. Army troops at the Battle of the Clearwater on July 11–12. Colonel Gibbon hastily assembled a force of about 200 artillery, cavalry, and infantry and proceeded up the Bitterroot River into the Big Hole Basin to stop them. On August 9, Gibbon attacked with his infantry and artillery at dawn. But the Nez Perce captured his howitzer and Nez Perce sharpshooters killed 30 of his men and officers. The Battle of the Big Hole continued until August 10, as the Nez Perce pinned Gibbon's men down in a coulee. The band finally fled, 89 of their own (mostly women and children) dead. After a lengthy flight through Montana, the Nez Perce finally surrendered at the Battle of Bear Paw near Chinook, Montana, on October 5, 1877. Montana saw its last skirmishes with Native Americans in 1878.

Later commanders
In the summer of 1878, the 7th Infantry was moved to Saint Paul, Minnesota, and Fort Shaw became the headquarters of the 3rd U.S. Infantry Regiment under the command of Colonel John R. Brooke. Brooke was promoted to Lieutenant Colonel on March 20, 1879, and assigned to the 13th Infantry Regiment (then in the Dakotas). But undisclosed personnel issues kept Brooke at Fort Shaw. He was joined by Colonel Luther Prentice Bradley. There were six companies in the 3rd Infantry. Company A was assigned to Fort Benton. Companies C, E, F, and G were assigned to Fort Shaw. Company K was assigned to Fort Logan (the former Camp Baker).

Life at Fort Shaw was increasingly peaceful. Company E of the 3rd Infantry was sent from Fort Shaw to Fort Ellis in the spring of 1879, and it was followed by Company C in the summer. (They stayed there until Fort Ellis closed in 1886, and then were transferred to Fort Custer, where they remained.) Companies A and K were reassigned to Fort Shaw in 1881. In the fall and summer of 1882 and 1883, at least two companies from Fort Shaw were kept in the field at all times, observing Native American movements and discouraging raids on white settlements south of the Piegan Blackfeet reservation. The peaceful life was not necessarily fun for the isolated soldiers, who often visited nearby communities to drink. In 1885, the first Independence Day celebrations occurred in Great Falls. Soldiers from Fort Shaw became roaring drunk during the day, and fired several cannonballs down Central Avenue (the city's main street) around midnight.

In April 1888, Colonel Brooke was promoted to brigadier general, and the 3rd Infantry transferred to forts in the Dakotas and Minnesota. The 25th Infantry Regiment, under the command of Colonel George Lippitt Andrews, took up station at Fort Shaw in May 1888 in its stead. By this time, Fort Shaw was no longer seen as a key fort in the Army's chain of military posts across Montana. Just two companies of the 25th Infantry (I and K) resided at Fort Shaw, under the command of Lieutenant Colonel James J. Van Horn. These two companies were "skeletonized" in September 1890, leaving Fort Shaw with only a minimal military presence.

The construction of Fort Assinniboine (which cost $1 million to build) in 1879 led to the creation of a new center of U.S. military power in Montana far from the more settled central and southwestern parts of the state, and led to the eventual closure of Fort Shaw and Fort Ellis. Fort Shaw was abandoned by the U.S. Army on July 1, 1891.

Civilian use

Fort Shaw Indian school
By 1892, the Fort Shaw military reservation totaled . Ownership of Fort Shaw was transferred from the United States Department of War to the United States Department of the Interior on April 30, 1892. Another  were turned over to the school for agricultural purposes on July 6, 1905. On July 22, 1905, President Theodore Roosevelt issued an executive order giving the Secretary of the Interior the authority to dispose of all the land of the former Fort Shaw Military Reservation, holding in reserve those acres in use by the Indian school.

By the 1880s, the United States government undertook a major initiative to pacify Native American tribes through nonviolent means. A key element in this effort was the creation of boarding schools. These schools, sometimes on reservations but just as often not, were originally run by religious groups. By the 1890s, however, the schools had been largely secularized and were being run by government employees and government-employed teachers. The goal of Indian boarding schools was two-fold: First, to strip Native American children of their language and culture, teach them the English language, and instill in them the values and cultural ways of white Americans; and second, to teach them academic subjects, vocational trades, and other skills that were valued by white American business and society.

The Fort Shaw school came into existence after the government boarding school on the Fort Peck Indian Reservation suffered severe fires in November 1891 and the fall of 1892. The school was modeled on Indian schools in Carlisle, Pennsylvania; Lawrence, Kansas; and Newkirk, Oklahoma, and was named the Fort Shaw Government Industrial Indian Boarding School, The school officially opened on December 27, 1892, with Dr. William Winslow as the school's superintendent, first teacher, and physician. It had 52 students, but by the end of 1893 enrollment had climbed to 176. Administrators and faculty were housed in the old officers' quarters, which students boarded in the former soldiers' barracks. Students ranged in age from five to 18, and came from tribes in Montana, Idaho, and Wyoming. Half of each day was spent learning English and in academic study. The rest of the day was spent working in the school's garden, stables, and pastures raising the meat and vegetables which supplied the school with food; in making uniforms and shoes for the children to wear; and in maintaining and repairing the school's buildings and furniture. The vocational curriculum was gender-specific. Girls learned to cook "white" food the "white" way, sew, clean house, make dairy products (butter, cream, skim milk) from raw milk, and engage in crocheting, lace-making, and other needlework. Boys were taught the essentials of farming and ranching, as well as skills such as blacksmithing, carpentry, construction, masonry, and woodworking. Sports were taught to both boys and girls. Girls played double ball, lacrosse, and shinny (informal ice hockey). Boys were taught baseball, football, and track.

Students at Fort Shaw usually spent their first two years at the school learning English and "white" cultural norms. Children were grouped in grades according to their skill levels, which meant that both very young children and young adults could be found in the same class. Students advanced to the next grade based on achievement, and there was no social stigma for students who stayed for a two or more years in the same grade. Fort Shaw's curriculum ended at the eighth grade, but students in their late teens (indeed, some as old as 25 years of age) could be found studying there.

Dr. Winslow resigned his position on September 9, 1898, and Frederick C. Campbell became Fort Shaw School's superintendent. At that time, the school had 300 students from every tribe in Montana as well as the Bannock, Colville, Kalispel, Paiute, and Shoshone tribes of neighboring Idaho, Washington, and Wyoming. Most students had a white father and Native American mother, and another many were there voluntarily a large number had been forcibly taken from their parents by government agents and forced to attend the "white" school against their wishes. Senator Paris Gibson visited the school in 1901, at which time it had 30 administrators and teachers and 316 students. A girls' basketball team was organized at Fort Shaw School in 1902. Campbell became the girls' basketball coach. The girls' team began interscholastic play in November 1902 (defeating Butte Parochial High School), and on January 15, 1903, played the very first basketball game (men's or women's) in nearby Great Falls, Montana. (Fort Shaw lost to Butte Parochial, 15-to-6.) In 1903, the team twice defeated the women's basketball team from Montana Agricultural College, once in Great Falls (36-to-9) and again in Bozeman (20-to-0). The Fort Shaw girls defeated nearly every high school and college girls' basketball team in the state, as well as several high school boys' teams. The team ended its first year as undisputed (if unofficial) state champion. It was unable to reproduce that record in the 1903–04 season, as the team could not secure appointments for games with any other high school in the state that year.

In 1904, school superintendent Fred Campbell agreed to send his girls' basketball team to the Louisiana Purchase Exposition (better known as the St. Louis World's Fair) in St. Louis, Missouri. To fund their trip, the team stopped at numerous points along the way to play exhibition games against other high school and college girls' teams. After each game, the girls donned traditional native ceremonial garb and charged a fee (50 cents) for a program of dance, music, and recitations. Part of the United States' pavilion at the world's fair was a Model Indian School. The girls would live and take classes at the school, and twice a week would hold intra-squad exhibitions. The girls also agreed to take on all challengers. The girls departed from Fort Shaw on June 1, 1904. The 11 girls defeated every single team they played over the next five months, earning themselves the title "world champions".

The Fort Shaw Indian school closed in 1910 due to low attendance.

Ownership by the town of Fort Shaw
After its closure as an Indian school, Fort Shaw was turned over to the Fort Shaw Public School District, and the buildings were used as a public school.

The name Fort Shaw was revived when it became the name of a station and later a small town on the Vaughn-Augusta branch line of the Great Northern Railroad and some distance from the fort remnants. Today there are some buildings from the old days of the fort and one serves as a historical museum that's only open during the summer.

Today, most of the existing buildings and grounds of Fort Shaw, with the exception of the school and playground are under a long term lease by the Sun River Valley Historical Society.

Commanding officers
The commanding officers at Fort Shaw changed over time. Not all officers were present even when assigned to the fort, as they often traveled with their troops or moved among the various forts, camps, and settlements under their jurisdiction.

1867–1870 — 13th Infantry Regiment
General Phillipe Régis de Trobriand
Colonel I. V. D. Reeves
Lieutenant Colonel G. L. Andrews (post commandant)
Major William Clinton

1870–1878 — 7th Infantry Regiment
Colonel John Gibbon

1878–1888 — 3rd U.S. Infantry Regiment
Colonel John R. Brooke
Lieutenant Colonel George Gibsin

1888–1891 — 25th Infantry Regiment
Lieutenant Colonel James J. Van Horn
Lieutenant Colonel George Leonard Andrews (commanding from Fort Missoula)

Fort Shaw historic site
In 1936, the state of Montana erected a historic marker at the site of Fort Shaw. The marker consists of a  redwood board on which is text describing Fort Shaw and some of its history. The sign hangs on short chains from a redwood crossbar which itself is mortar-joined and bolted to upright redwood posts. The painted sign was replaced with one in which the text was routed and painted white in the 1940s. It is one of the original historic highway markers erected by the state, and is one in the best condition as of 2008.

The National Park Service considered adding Fort Shaw to its system after proposals by the Sons and Daughters of Montana Pioneers in 1936 and 1938. However, after conducting a study, officials determined the site was "not of national significance." Fort Shaw is part of the Fort Shaw Historic District and Cemetery, which was added to the National Register of Historic Places on January 11, 1985. A portion of the fort remains standing as of 2009.

References
Notes

Citations

Bibliography

External links
Fort Shaw Web site

National Register of Historic Places in Cascade County, Montana
Shaw
1867 establishments in Montana Territory
Buildings and structures completed in 1867
Schools in Cascade County, Montana
Educational institutions established in 1892
1892 establishments in Montana
Museums in Cascade County, Montana
Educational institutions disestablished in 1910